Kingsley Castle, also known as Castle Cob, a medieval motte in Kingsley, Cheshire, England. It is listed as a Scheduled Ancient Monument. It is artificial and made from black soil.

Historians used to think that the motte was a large barrow. The stone steps and concrete foundations of a summerhouse not contemporary with the castle are excluded from the protection of the scheduling. There have been limited excavations on the site by antiquarians.

See also

List of castles in Cheshire

References

Castles in Cheshire
Scheduled monuments in Cheshire